The National Alien Registration Authority (NARA) was an institution of the Government of Pakistan, under the Ministry of Interior and Narcotics Control, for the main purpose of legally registering and documenting immigrants and other foreign residents in the country.

NARA was established in 2000, and was headquartered in the City of Karachi.

NARA was formally merged into the National Database and Registration Authority (NADRA) in 2015.

References

Immigration services
Immigration to Pakistan
Pakistan federal departments and agencies
Regulatory authorities of Pakistan
Defunct government departments and agencies of Pakistan
Government agencies established in 2000
Government agencies disestablished in 2015
2000 establishments in Pakistan
2015 disestablishments in Pakistan